Deming Glacier is located on Mount Baker in the North Cascades of the U.S. state of Washington. Between 1850 and 1950, Deming Glacier retreated . During a cooler and wetter period from 1950 to 1979, the glacier advanced  but between 1980 and 2006 retreated back . Situated on the southwest slopes of Mount Baker, Deming Glacier is bordered by the Easton Glacier to the east and the Black Buttes ridge to the west.

See also 
List of glaciers in the United States

References 

Glaciers of Mount Baker
Glaciers of Washington (state)